Khalaj (also known as Khaiash, Khoiash, and Kholash) is a village in Bedevostan-e Sharqi Rural District, in the Central District of Heris County, East Azerbaijan Province, Iran. At the 2006 census, its population was 125, in 29 families.

References 

Populated places in Heris County